The 2007 San Jose State Spartans football team represented San Jose State University in the 2007 NCAA Division I FBS football season. This season was the Spartans' third season with Dick Tomey as head coach.

Preseason
At the end of the 2007 season, former assistant coach Marcus Arroyo, who was named co-offensive coordinator with Steve Morton in 2006, had to let Morton be in charge of the offense in cooperation.

In addition, at the end of the 2006 season, the Spartans had lost 17 lettermen, 9 from offense, and 8 from defense  San Jose State wide receivers James Jones and John Broussard entered the 2007 NFL Draft at the end of the 2006 season. James Jones was picked early in the third round for the Green Bay Packers, and Broussard was picked in the seventh round for the Jacksonville Jaguars.

The Spartans opened spring drills in early March and the annual spring game took place on mid-April.

Personnel

Coaching staff

Roster

Depth chart

Schedule

Game summaries

at Arizona State

at Kansas State

at Stanford

at Utah State

UC Davis

Idaho

No. 16 Hawaii

The Spartans held Hawaii to their closest game on October 12, 2007. In the rain-drenched Spartan Stadium, the Warriors and the Spartans clashed in front of 20,437 fans. The Spartans got off to a rocky start, letting Hawaii 's Kealoha Pilares score on a 6-yard run. The Hawaii offense also took advantage of another scoring opportunity in the second quarter, with Ryan Grice-Mullins' 16-yard reception touchdown from Colt Brennan. The Spartans rebounded, with Dwight Lowery returning a Will Johnson kick for 84 yards. That ended the scoring for the first half at 7–14. The Spartans gained enormous momentum in the third quarter. First, by having Lowery once again score, on a 24-yard interception run. Soon thereafter, Kevin Jurovich took advantage of a 16-yard pass from Adam Tafralis. The duo would be effective again, by scoring on a 68-yard pass from Tafralis on a drive that would only take four plays. Hawaii got their only touchdown that quarter CJ Hawthorne's 34-yard reception touchdown from Brennan. The Spartans started strong in the fourth quarter, by scoring on an 8-yard run by James T. Callier. Hawaii took advantage and scored on a Davone Bess 11-yard run from Brennan. Brennan scored the last touchdown in the fourth quarter making the score 35–35, and leading the game into overtime. The Warriors scored the first touchdown by a 9-yard pass from Brennan to Jason Rivers, ending the heart-pounding game at a score of 42–35. For the second straight season, San Jose State had a crushing home loss to a BCS hopeful. The Spartans lost a late eight-point lead against Boise State last year before falling 23–20 on a last-second field goal. "It was disappointing to lose to Boise State and this was even more disappointing," coach Dick Tomey said. But Tomey reassured the positives of the loss, "We played our butts off and that's good for us." Tafralis finished 27-for-47 for 302 yards and three interceptions. Jurovich had seven catches for 117 yards.

at Fresno State

at No. 21 Boise State

New Mexico State

at Louisiana Tech

Nevada

References

San Jose State
San Jose State Spartans football seasons
San Jose State Spartans football